SDS Sessions V.1 is the first live EP from American rock band Julien-K, recorded on August 9, 2011 at the Clouds Hill Studio in Hamburg, Germany. A limited number of vinyl copies and an early digital release was provided exclusively to members of the band's fan-club Systeme de Street.

The EP was included in its entirety as the 4 last tracks of the 4th CD on the box set Time Capsule: A Future Retrospective, released in 2018.

Someday Soon and Maestro are live renditions of Headcleanr and Koma & Bones remixes, respectively, from their remix album Death to Digital. Dregs Of The World was later remixed by Julien-K themselves and included on the deluxe edition of their album, We're Here With You, in 2012.

Track listing

References 

Julien-K albums
2011 albums